Nicole Dunsdon (born November 7, 1970) was the last person to win the Miss Canada competition before it was cancelled in 1992.

Biography
Dunsdon was born November 6, 1970. She is from Summerland, British Columbia.

She graduated from Summerland Secondary School in 1988; from the University of Alberta with a Bachelor of Arts in Psychology in 1994; and from the University of Western Ontario with a Master of Arts in Journalism the following year.

Dunsdon was crowned Miss Canada in October 1991. She also competed in Miss Universe 1992 in Bangkok, Thailand. 

Some women's organizations considered the Miss Canada pageant to encourage the sexual objectification of women. Dunsdon said in 2009 that there are beauty pageant contestants that meet the stereotypes; "egotistical, materialistic, slightly air-headed and ill-informed... but those ones never win." She ascribed the cancellation of the pageant to the early 1990s recession, and expressed disappointment "that something as traditional as the Miss Canada pageant was touchable by the economic recession." 

As a journalist, she was one of the editors of Harold McGill's memoirs. In addition to editing three books, Dunsdon worked with The Calgary Herald and The Globe and Mail before taking a position in communications with SAIT Polytechnic's Applied Research and Innovation Services department. Today, Dunsdon is a communications specialist at the University of Calgary's Schulich School of Engineering.

Family
Dunsdon married Patrick Kryczka, and was the daughter-in-law of Joe Kryczka. They separated in 2015. Dunsdon and Kryczka's son Spencer played hockey for the Okotoks Oilers, and the Princeton Tigers.

References

External links

1970 births
Living people
Canadian book editors
Canadian women journalists
Canadian women non-fiction writers
Miss Canada winners
Miss Universe 1992 contestants
People from Summerland, British Columbia
University of Alberta alumni
Academic staff of the University of Calgary
University of Western Ontario alumni